The sociological study of peace, war, and social conflict uses sociological theory and methods to analyze group conflicts, especially collective violence and alternative constructive nonviolent forms of conflict transformation.

The by-laws of the Section on Peace, War and Social Conflict of the American Sociological Association specify:

The purpose of the Section on Peace, War, and Social Conflict is to foster the development and application of sociological theories and methods for the understanding and study of dynamics of collective conflict and its prevention, conduct, and resolution. Included is the study of military institutions and conflict between collectivities such as countries, ethnic groups, political movements, and religious groups. Also included are the roles of military organizations, other governmental organizations, non-governmental organizations, and social movements.

See also

 Amity-enmity complex
 Bandwagon effect
 Failed state
 Groupthink 
 Ideocracy
Peace and conflict studies
 Power politics
 Power Politics (Wight book)
Military sociology
Sociology of terrorism
 Societal collapse
 State collapse
 The true believer
 The anatomy of revolution

Notes

Further reading
Sinisa Malesevic, 2010. The Sociology of War and Violence. Cambridge: Cambridge University Press.
John MacDougall, Morten G. Ender, Teaching the sociology of peace, war, and social conflict: a curriculum guide, American Sociological Association, 2003

Conflict (process)
Majority–minority relations